The second election to West Glamorgan County Council and was held in May 1977. It was preceded by the 1973 election and followed by the 1981 election.

Candidates
The Labour Party fielded candidates in every ward. A significant proportion of seats were contested by the Conservative Party and Plaid Cymru with fewer candidates fielded by the Liberal Party.

A feature of the election was the number of Ratepayer candidates.

Outcome
Labour retained their majority but lost a number of seats, mainly to the Ratepayers but also to Plaid Cymru and Independents.

In the Neath area, three retiring Labour councillors were defeated.

Results
 indicates sitting councillor

Ward Results

Aberavon East and West (three seats)

Aberavon North (one seat)

Aberavon South (one seat)

Brynmelyn (two seats)

Castle (two seats)

Cwmafan (one seat)
John was elected as a Progressive candidate in 1973.

Fforest Fach (two seats)

Ffynone (two seats)

Glyncorrwg (two seats)

Gower No.1 (one seat)

Gower No.2 (one seat)

Gower No.3 (one seat)

Landore (two seats)

Llansamlet (two seats)

Llwchwr No.1 (one seat)

Llwchwr No.2 (two seats)

Llwchwr No.3 (two seats)

Margam Central (one seat)

Margam North (one seat)

Margam West (one seat)

Morriston (two seats)

Mumbles (two seats)

Neath No.1, South and Briton Ferry (four seats)

Neath No.2, North, Pontrhydyfen and Tonmawr (two seats)

Neath Rural (six seats)

Neath Rural No.5 (one seat)

Penderry (three seats)

Pontardawe No.1 (one seat)

Pontardawe No.2 (two seats)

Pontardawe No.3 (three seats)

St Helens (two seats)

Sketty (three seats)

St Johns (two seats)

St Thomas (two seats)

Townhill (two seats)

Victoria (two seats)

References

West Glamorgan
West Glamorgan County Council elections